Process supervision is a form of operating system service management in which some master process remains the parent of the service processes.

Benefits
Benefits compared to traditional process launchers and system boot mechanisms, like System V init, include:

 Ability to restart services which have failed
 The fact that it does not require the use of "pidfiles"
 Clean process state
 Reliable logging, because the master process can capture the stdout/stderr of the service process and route it to a log
 Faster (concurrent) and ability to start up and stop

Implementations

 daemontools
 daemontools-encore: Derived from the public-domain release of daemontools
 Eye: A Ruby implementation
 Finit: Fast, Extensible Init for Linux Systems
 God: A Ruby implementation
 immortal: A Go implementation
  PM2: A Process Manager for Node.js
 Initng
 launchd
 minit: A small, yet feature-complete Linux init
 Monit
 runit
 Supervisor: A Python implementation
 s6: Low-level process and service supervision
 Systemd

References

Computing terminology